Charles Pollard (born March 24, 1973) is a retired Guyanese footballer and current assistant coach at the Guyana national football team.

He has been capped over 60 times and played several years in Trinidad and Tobago's Pro League.

Playing career

Club
He started his career in Guyana and playing for Alpha United, Pele and Netrockers. He was voted Guyana player of the year in 1998. Later he moved to Trinidad & Tobago where he proceeded to spend almost all of his career playing professional football for clubs including Docs Kewalas, W Connection, San Juan Jabloteh and two spells with North East Stars, where he became team captain, leading them to championship in 2004.

After a spell in the US playing for United Soccer League side Brooklyn Knights, he returned to Trinidad to play for Caledonia AIA. He joined Joe Public in January 2010 but after just two starts he left the club in April 2010 citing the need to get more regular football in his final season before retirement. Later the same month he rejoined former club North East Stars for the 2010–11 season.

International
Capped numerous times by the national team (1996-2012), he was the international squad's team captain between 1999 and 2007.

Managerial career
Nicknamed Lily, Pollard was named assistant to national team head coach Michael Johnson in February 2019.

References

External links
 
 

1973 births
Living people
Sportspeople from Georgetown, Guyana
Association football defenders
Guyanese footballers
Guyana international footballers
Alpha United FC players
North East Stars F.C. players
TT Pro League players
Morvant Caledonia United players
Expatriate footballers in Trinidad and Tobago
Guyanese expatriate sportspeople in Trinidad and Tobago
Brooklyn Knights players
San Juan Jabloteh F.C. players
USL League Two players
Pele FC players
Association football coaches